Mambwe may refer to:
the Mambwe people
the Mambwe language
Patrick Mambwe (born 1944), a Zambian boxer of the 1960s and '70s